Rohit Kalia is an Indian Australian actor, model and voiceover artist who appears in English, Hindi, Tamil and Telugu language films and television serials. He is also the winner of first ever Mr India Australia title held in Sydney, Australia in 2014. Rohit was selected as a Body Fit Model for Big W clothing brand at Sydney in June 2018. He has also done Opal card web commercials for Transport for NSW at Sydney in August 2019.

Rohit has played the lead role of Lord Krishna at Claremont Showground, Perth during ISWA Diwali Festival on 8 November 2020. In 2021, he starred in Fringe World Festival shows Naughty Nights at Nine and Play in a Day. In the inaugural Short and Sweet (festival) 2021 of Perth, he played the title role of Corporate finance officer in It was Tuesday play which came on the third spot in the judges vote.

From August 2021 to October 2021, he did lead voice-overs for the Guardian Australia in its podcast episodes titled Rohingya United and Tampa affair.

In 2022, he starred in the Road Safety Commission's Belt up campaign as a cricket player which ran across Australian television, on-demand TV, radio, social media, and roadside billboards.

Background
Born in Pune into a Punjabi family, he did his schooling in Ludhiana at B.C.M. Arya Model School, and graduated in Mechanical Engineering from Nagpur University at Raisoni College of Engineering and then joined Infosys. In 2010, Rohit completed acting course at Anupam Kher's Actor Prepares School. He is fluent in English, Hindi and Punjabi.

Career
Rohit begins his acting career with a corporate short film. Later, he played lead roles in theatres at Chandigarh, Sydney and had won Best Actor "First Runner Up" Award at Abhinay School of Performing Arts Sydney. He has also done Australian Television Programs like A Current Affair and Legally Brown, and worked as Radio narrator for various Australian Government Educational programs.

In 2013, Rohit made his debut as a lead actor in a Telugu Feature film NRI - Now Return to India, directed by Raghunandan Gudur and co-starring Ahuti Prasad and Hema. He also played a cameo as Anushka Shetty's fiancé in Selvaraghavan's Irandam Ulagam.

Later in 2015, Rohit played the lead role in Love & Love Only that was released in Australia on 24 September 2016. It was directed by Indian born Australian film director Julian Karikalan who is also the editor and producer of the film. Australian actress Georgia Nicholas played the lead actress in the film. The music is given by Maestro Ilaiyaraaja and this is his first English feature film as a music director. The songs were sung by the South Australian singer Rachael Leahcar and the background tracks were recorded in Prasad Studios, Chennai.

Love & Love Only was released worldwide online on 22 November 2016 and was launched by Venkat Prabhu, from Chennai, India.
The film had earlier won two awards at the International Film and Entertainment Festival of Australia in 2015.

In 2021, he was invited as a Chief Guest by Indian SGF affiliated to International Scout and Guide Fellowship  during the 3rd Film Festival held in New Delhi.

Filmography

External links

References 

Male actors in Tamil cinema
Male actors in Telugu cinema
People from Pune
Year of birth missing (living people)
Living people